L. Adaikalaraj was an Indian politician and former Member of Parliament elected from Tamil Nadu. He was elected to the Lok Sabha from Tiruchirappalli constituency as an Indian National Congress candidate in 1984, 1989 and 1991 elections and as a Tamil Maanila Congress (Moopanar) candidate in 1996 election.

References 

Indian National Congress politicians from Tamil Nadu
2012 deaths
1936 births
India MPs 1984–1989
India MPs 1989–1991
India MPs 1991–1996
India MPs 1996–1997
Lok Sabha members from Tamil Nadu
Tamil Maanila Congress politicians
People from Tiruchirappalli district